Felisberto Micael Lopes Darame (born 18 March 1994) known as Betinho, is a Portuguese footballer who plays for Moncarapachense as a forward.

Club career
On 9 January 2013, Betinho made his professional debut with Olhanense in a 2012–13 Taça da Liga match against Moreirense.

References

External links

Stats and profile at LPFP 

1994 births
Living people
People from Loulé
Portuguese footballers
Association football forwards
S.C. Olhanense players
S.R. Almancilense players
Segunda Divisão players
Sportspeople from Faro District